Phoenix is a village in Cook County, Illinois, United States. The population was 1,708 at the 2020 census.

History
The development of Phoenix is closely tied to its larger neighbor, Harvey. Harvey was established as an industrial city with no saloons. Many of its early factories were located between the Illinois Central Railroad and Harvey's eastern boundary at Halsted Street. One local businessman, William McLatchy, owned a large tract of land in an unincorporated area outside of Harvey. Soon, five saloons had opened in the area and a small housing subdivision known as Phenix Park was constructed during the 1890s. City leaders in Harvey, seeing businesses just outside their boundaries selling alcohol to local workers, sought to annex Phenix Park and render it "dry" or free of alcohol-related establishments. The residents of Phenix Park wanted to retain local control of their affairs as an independent village. On August 29, 1900, an election was held to determine the future status of the area. A total of 56 votes were cast with 38 (67.9%) voting in favor of incorporation and 18 (32.1%) against. Despite legal challenges from Harvey, the result was upheld.

After incorporation, the name Phenix Park was changed to Phoenix. By 1910, the village had a population of 500, with most residents being of either Dutch or Polish ancestry. The first African Americans moved to Phoenix in 1915. Most came from Chicago and the South. Industry in Harvey and the railroads provided a strong employment base for Phoenix residents. The African American population steadily increased during the 1920s. By 1930, the village was home to 3,033 people. The demographic makeup of the community was 84.2% White, 15.1% Black, and 0.7% other. Growth continued through the 1940s and 1950s. New housing was constructed to accommodate this growth. The population in 1960 was 4,203. At this time, Phoenix had a diverse ethnic composition but the community was racially segregated. African Americans, comprising 65.3% of the population, lived in the northern portion of the village while Whites, forming 34.7% of the population, lived in the southern portion of Phoenix. In 1960, the municipal administration of Phoenix voted to de-annex the predominantly White portion of the village into Harvey. The exchange occurred in 1962 and with it, Phoenix lost one-third of its population as well as 60% of its tax base.

By 1990, the population was 2,217. 

On October 16, 1979, Phoenix Mayor William Hawkins was shot and fatally wounded in an ambush outside of his home.  He died two days later.    Bobby Joe Anderson, a city policeman, was indicted 13 years later for the crime and was convicted of first degree murder in the killing of Hawkins.

Geography
Phoenix is located at  (41.612333, -87.630545) in southern Cook County. The village is nestled between Harvey and South Holland.

Surrounding areas
 Harvey 
 Harvey    South Holland
 Harvey   South Holland
 Harvey    South Holland
 Harvey / South Holland

Demographics
As of the 2020 census there were 1,708 people, 612 households, and 261 families residing in the village. The racial makeup of the village was 85.30% African American, 1.23% White, 0.53% Native American, 0.23% Asian, 0.18% Pacific Islander, 7.85% from other races, and 4.68% from two or more races. Hispanic or Latino of any race were 11.94% of the population.

There were 612 households, out of which 19.93% had children under the age of 18 living with them, 16.01% were married couples living together, 17.81% had a female householder with no husband present, and 57.35% were non-families. 54.58% of all households were made up of individuals, and 23.04% had someone living alone who was 65 years of age or older. The average household size was 3.62 and the average family size was 2.29.

The village's age distribution consisted of 17.8% under the age of 18, 11.1% from 18 to 24, 23.5% from 25 to 44, 29.1% from 45 to 64, and 18.5% who were 65 years of age or older. The median age was 43.2 years. For every 100 females, there were 83.3 males. For every 100 females age 18 and over, there were 79.0 males.

The median income for a household in the village was $30,455, and the median income for a family was $44,076. Males had a median income of $25,586 versus $30,313 for females. The per capita income for the village was $20,421. About 26.4% of families and 29.1% of the population were below the poverty line, including 32.4% of those under age 18 and 16.9% of those age 65 or over.

Note: the US Census treats Hispanic/Latino as an ethnic category. This table excludes Latinos from the racial categories and assigns them to a separate category. Hispanics/Latinos can be of any race.

Government
Phoenix is in Illinois's 2nd congressional district.

Notable people
 Academic Psychologist Claude Steele was born in Phoenix.
 Author and columnist Shelby Steele 
 WBBM-TV sports anchor Ryan Baker
 Basketball star Quinn Buckner was born in Phoenix.
 Former NBA Player Kevin Duckworth
 Former NBA Player Sam Mack
 Melvin Van Peebles (born 1932), actor, filmmaker, playwright, novelist and composer. He was a childhood resident of Phoenix.

References

External links
Village of Phoenix official website

Villages in Illinois
Villages in Cook County, Illinois
Chicago metropolitan area
Populated places established in 1900
1900 establishments in Illinois
Majority-minority cities and towns in Cook County, Illinois